The Cider Museum is located in the Plaza del Príncipe de Asturias in Nava, Asturias, Spain. Opened in 1996 by Prince Philip, it is a themed museum that showcases Asturian national drink, cider. The museum is a member of the Ethnographic Museums Network of Asturias.

Interactive exhibits cover the entire process of cider creation, from growing apples, through pressing, fermenting, bottling, to consumption of this alcoholic beverage.  There is an area devoted to sparkling cider. The museum also focuses on issues such as pollination and the development of apple trees.

Summer and winter hours vary.

See also

 List of food and beverage museums

References

Cider
Museums in Asturias
Museums established in 1996
Drink-related museums
Agriculture museums in Spain